The 2021–22 Lietuvos krepšinio lyga, also called Betsafe-LKL for sponsorship reasons, was the 29th season of the top-tier level professional basketball league of Lithuania, the Lietuvos krepšinio lyga (LKL). Žalgiris was defending champions.

For the first time since league's inception, Žalgiris failed to reach finals, after losing semifinal series to Lietkabelis 3–1

Rytas after 12 years break won Betsafe–LKL championship and achieved their 6th title overall.

Teams

Location and arenas

On 27 April 2021, during 2020–21 LKL season LKL board decided to expand the number of participating teams in tournament. The number of teams has been expanded to 11 teams. 2020-21 NKL season champions Cbet Jonava will join the other 10 LKL teams.

Managerial changes

Regular season

League table

Results

Playoffs
 
Quarterfinals and semifinals will be played in a best–of–five games format, while the finals and third place in a best–of–seven format.

Bracket

Final standings

Attendance

Average attendances

Awards
All official awards of the 2021-22 LKL season.

Regular Season MVP

LKL Finals MVP

All-LKL Team

Coach of the Year

Best Defender

Breakthrough of the Year

Player of the month

Statistics

Individual statistics

Rating

Source: LKL.LT

Points

Source: LKL.LT

Rebounds

Source: LKL.LT

Assists

Source: LKL.LT

Other statistics

Source: LKL.LT

Individual game highs

Source: LKL.LT

Team statistics

Source: LKL.LT

Lithuanian clubs in European competitions

Sponsors

References

Lietuvos krepšinio lyga seasons
Basketball in Lithuania
L